Burkhard Dick (born 1963 in Brake, Lower Saxony) is a German ophthalmologist who has specialized in refractive and cataract surgery. With his many contributions to the scientific literature on this topic, he is considered one of the pioneers of employing the femtosecond laser in cataract surgery. In the "Power List 2018" ranking of the world's most influential ophthalmologists by the publication The Ophthalmologist, Burkhard Dick was listed among the Top 20.

Biography 
Dick attended high school in his hometown of Brake and graduated in 1983. After studying medicine at University of Giessen, he began his specialization as an eye surgeon. As a board certified ophthalmologist, Dick in 1996 joined the eye hospital of the University of Mainz where he became a full professor in 2003. In 2006, Dick was appointed chair of the department of ophthalmology at the University of Bochum and director of the University Eye Clinic. He turned the clinic into one of the surgical centers with the highest number of cataract patients treated with the femtosecond laser, a new technology which has the potential to improve the precision of cataract surgery which is the most frequent surgical intervention in North America and Europe. Burkhard Dick has been president of the German Society of Cataract and Refractive Surgery (DGII) from 2016 to 2020. Currently, Dick is a council member of the European Society of Cataract and Refractive Surgeons (ESCRS) and chairman of the society's Research Committee.

Scientific contributions 
Dick has published a large number of scientific articles and book chapters on various issues in eye surgery. He has informed the medical community about his experience with the femtosecond laser in special cases like patients with Marfan syndrome, with advanced cataracts, in pediatric cataracts and in individuals who had undergone corneal refractive surgery or are suffering from corneal disease.

Memberships 
 American Society of Cataract and Refractive Surgery (ASCRS)
 European Society of Cataract and Refractive Surgeons (ESCRS)
 American-European Congress of Ophthalmic Surgery (AECOS)
 International Intra-Ocular Implant Club (IIIC)
 European Vision Institute Clinical Research Network  (EVICR)
 German Ophthalmological Society (DOG)
 Professional Association of German Ophthalmologists (BVA)
 German Society for intraocular lens implantation (DGII)

External links 
  YouTube channel of the University Eye Hospital Bochum with videos of different procedures in cataract surgery.
  Article in "Ophthalmology Times" on Burkhard Dick's surgery of infants with cataract.
  Profile on the website of the American-European Congress of Ophthalmic Surgery

Selected publications
 with RD Gerste: Future Intraocular Lens Technologies. In: Ophthalmology, published online December 26, 2020. 
 Future perspectives of the femtosecond laser in anterior segment surgery. In: Der Ophthalmologe. May 2020;117(5):431-436.
 Small-aperture strategies for the correction of presbyopia. In: Current Opinion in Ophthalmology. 2019 Jul;30(4):236-242.
 with T. Schultz: Influence of the vitreolenticular interface in pediatric cataract surgery. In: Journal of Cataract and Refractive Surgery. 2019 Mar;45(3):388. 
 with T. Schultz, RD Gerste: Femtosecond Laser in Ophthalmology. Thieme Publishing, New York 2018, . 
 with Federica Gualdi, Luca Gualdi et al.:Femto Laser Cataract Surgery. Jaypee Brothers Medical Publishing, New Delhi 2014, .
 with Oliver Schwenn: Viscoelastics in Ophthalmic Surgery. Springer, Heidelberg 2000, .
 with T. Schultz: Primary posterior laser-assisted capsulotomy. In: Journal of Refractive Surgery. 30, 2014,128–133.
 with T. Schultz: Laser-assisted cataract surgery in small pupils using mechanical dilation devices. In: Journal of Refractive Surgery. 29, 2013, 858–862.
 with I. Conrad-Hengerer, F. H. Hengerer, T. Schultz: Effect of femtosecond laser fragmentation on effective phacoemulsification time in cataract surgery. In: Journal of Rrefractive Surgery.'' 28,2012,879–883.

References 

German ophthalmologists
1963 births
Living people